The Central Savannah River Area (CSRA) is a trading and marketing region in the U.S. states of Georgia and South Carolina, spanning fourteen counties in Georgia and seven in South Carolina. The term was coined in 1950 by C.C. McCollum, the winner of a $250 contest held by The Augusta Chronicle to generate the best name for the area. Today the initialism is so commonly used that the full name is not known to all residents. The region is located on and named after the Savannah River, which forms the border between the two states. The largest cities within the CSRA are Augusta, Georgia and Aiken, South Carolina. (The CSRA does not include the city of Savannah, Georgia or any portion of the Savannah metropolitan area.)

The total population of the CSRA is 767,478 in 2018. According to the U.S. Census Bureau, the seven-county Augusta-Richmond County Metropolitan Statistical Area (at the center of the CSRA) had an estimated population of 580,270 in 2013, making it the second most populous in the state of Georgia.

Counties

In Georgia

In South Carolina

Communities

Places with more than 40,000 inhabitants
Augusta-Richmond County, Georgia (Principal city) Pop: 197,872

Places with 10,000 to 40,000 inhabitants
Martinez, Georgia Pop: 35,795
Aiken, South Carolina Pop: 29,884
Evans, Georgia Pop: 29,011
North Augusta, South Carolina Pop: 21,873
Grovetown, Georgia Pop: 12,210

Places with 5,000 to 10,000 inhabitants
Thomson, Georgia Pop: 6,718
Belvedere, South Carolina Pop: 5,792
Waynesboro, Georgia Pop: 5,816
Sandersville, Georgia Pop: 5,912

Places with 1,000 to 5,000 inhabitants

Places with less than 1,000 inhabitants

References

External links
CSRA Regional Commission (only encompassing the 13 Georgia counties)
CSRA Economic Opportunity Authority, Inc. (only encompassing the 13 Georgia counties)
Savannah River Site: CSRA Regional Science and Engineering Fair Regional science fair competition for science projects winning first-place at their respective schools (Grades 4-12)
Columbia County outpaces state population gains

Geography of Augusta, Georgia
Geography of Richmond County, Georgia
Geography of Columbia County, Georgia
Geography of Burke County, Georgia
Geography of McDuffie County, Georgia
Geography of Glascock County, Georgia
Geography of Hancock County, Georgia
Geography of Jefferson County, Georgia
Geography of Jenkins County, Georgia
Geography of Lincoln County, Georgia
Geography of Screven County, Georgia
Geography of Emanuel County, Georgia
Geography of Warren County, Georgia
Geography of Washington County, Georgia
Geography of Wilkes County, Georgia
Geography of Edgefield County, South Carolina
Geography of Aiken County, South Carolina
Geography of Allendale County, South Carolina
Geography of Bamberg County, South Carolina
Geography of Barnwell County, South Carolina
Geography of McCormick County, South Carolina
Geography of Saluda County, South Carolina